East Toronto was an incorporated community, currently part of Toronto, Ontario, Canada. It covered much of the present day neighbourhood of the Upper Beaches, stretching up to Danforth Avenue in the north, part of it stretching to Lake Ontario in the south a portion of the present-day neighbourhood, The Beaches. The central street in East Toronto was Main Street, running between Danforth Avenue to Kingston Road. The commercial center of the town was located at the intersection of Main Street and Lake View Avenue (present-day Gerrard Street). Following the annexation of East Toronto into Old Toronto, Main Street retained its name despite Toronto's conceptual Main Street being historically designated to be Yonge Street.

After the 1998 amalgamation of Toronto, "east Toronto" informally refers to Scarborough, a division of Toronto occupying its east end.

History

The area, after being colonized by British settlers, was occupied in about 1850, when it was a considerable distance from the city of Toronto. It was incorporated as a village in 1888 when there were about 800 people living in the area. The area began to grow rapidly and in 1903 it was elevated from a village to a town. The southern part of the community by the lake became one of Toronto's most popular travel destinations, and became home to hotels and amusement parks. The northern section, by contrast, was an industrial centre, home to the Grand Trunk Railway's main yards. These facilities stretched along most of Gerrard Street, and employed several hundred workers.

When East Toronto was annexed to city of Toronto in 1908 it had a population of about 5,000 people. The CN freight yards closed down in that same year of 1908 and relocated to Belleville and Etobicoke, a move that forced the area into a transition from a railway-based small town into a commuter-based neighbourhood within a city. The trunk yards themselves were essentially abandoned for over 90 years until a housing development was built on most of the land they once occupied

Today East Toronto commonly refers to the portion of the old city of Toronto east of the Don River. This includes neighbourhoods such as Upper Beaches, Riverdale, Leslieville, East Danforth, and the Beaches.

Street name changes

With the annexation by the city of Toronto in 1908, many East Toronto street names were changed, as the city of Toronto already had streets by those names.  The following tables show the changes made, with the names of changed streets in bold text.

North/south streets

The following north/south streets were outside the village limits of East Toronto, but were included in the annexation, and had their street names changed.

East/west streets

The following east/west streets were outside the village limits of East Toronto, but were included in the annexation.  Streets that had their names changed are in bold text.

References

External links

Filey, Mike "Why Our Main Street is Nowhere Near the Centre of the City." Toronto Sun, January 15, 2006
A History Tour of the Beach
East Toronto - From little village, thriving town, to a part of Beaches heritage
Early Maps of the Area

Neighbourhoods in Toronto
Former towns in Ontario
Former municipalities in Toronto